Seh Gonbad may refer to:
 Seh Gonbad, North Khorasan
 Seh Gonbad, Razavi Khorasan